Capsella rubella, the pink shepherd's-purse, is a plant species in the genus Capsella, a very close relative of Arabidopsis thaliana and a member of the mustard family, Brassicaceae. It has a very similar appearance to Capsella bursa-pastoris, but C. rubella has a diploid genome, whereas C. bursa-pastoris is tetraploid. Capsella rubella is used as a model plant to study the evolution of self-incompatibility into self-compatibility in plant reproduction. The species is found mostly in Mediterranean region. Separation of this species from its closest ancestor is predicted to have happened around 30,000 to 50,000 years ago.

References

rubella
Plants described in 1854
Flora of Malta